Frederick S. Mates, aka Frederic Mates, founded in August 1967 the Mates Investment Fund, a high-flying mutual fund during the 'Go-Go' 60s that later crashed in the bear market of the early 1970s. Mates ran his fund from an office he dubbed the "kibbutz" and with a young staff he called his "flower children". Mates put most of his fund into a letter stock known as Omega Equities. Mates in determining his funds assets assigned a value to the barely traded Omega of $16 a share, while having purchased the stock at $3.25 a share. Mates got into trouble over this practice which was routine in the 1960s and not uncommon even today, of accounting for letter stocks at a price different from what was paid for it. As a result, when confidence was lost in Mates' mutual fund and investors wanted to cash out, redemptions had to be suspended for a while, which the U.S. Securities and Exchange Commission condoned.

Mates was born in Brooklyn and graduated from Brooklyn College in 1954. According to a New York Times obituary, Mates died in Kansas City on December 25, 1982.

See also 
Gerald Tsai
Cortes Wesley Randell

Notes

References
 John Brooks Wiley.  The Go-Go Years: The Drama and Crashing Finale of Wall Street's Bullish 60s.  New Ed edition (September 10, 1999)  Excerpt
 Roger Lowenstein. Buffett: The Making of an American Capitalist. Random House 1995. 
 Returns for illiquid holdings in mutual funds are overstated study by Nicolas Bollen and Veronika Pool
 Time magazine Mates Checked Jan. 03, 1969
 Valerie Mates on Google Answers

1982 deaths
American financial businesspeople
Year of birth missing
Brooklyn College alumni